Grimsbury Castle is an Iron Age "multiple enclosure" Hill Fort comprising a large circular encampment situated on a high hill. It is situated within Grimsbury Wood, between Cold Ash and Hermitage, in the county of Berkshire.

History 

The site benefits from a natural spring which reportedly has never been known to run dry. The entrenchment would appear to have been extended on the south side of the hill for the purpose of enclosing this spring. This rampart appears to have had only two entrances, one on the north and the other on the south side; just within the entrenchment, at the entrance on the north, is a small tumulus, which may have been constructed as a mount for observation or defense, or for the purpose of interment.

The name shows that the later Saxon settlers in the region found the earthworks so impressive that they thought they must have been built by the chief of their gods, Woden alias Grim.

The site lies at an elevation of 155m AOD. There is an 18th-century folly on the site, also known as Grimsbury Castle.

Today the site is crossed by a small, single-track roadway.

References

External links 
Grimsbury Castle at the Digital Hillfort Project

Hill forts in Berkshire
West Berkshire District
Iron Age sites in England